"Rudie Can't Fail" is a song by the English punk rock band the Clash, featured on their 1979 album London Calling. The song was written by Joe Strummer and Mick Jones, who sing it as a duet.

Composition

Like some songs on London Calling, "Rudie Can't Fail" has a strong reggae, rocksteady influence. Donald A. Guarisco of Allmusic described it as "an exuberant horn-driven number that mixes pop and soul elements in to spice up its predominantly reggae sound".

Lyrics

"Rudie Can't Fail" praises the rude boys of Jamaica in the 1960s who challenged their elders' status quo. The song is about a fun-loving young man who is criticised by his elders for not acting as a responsible adult, drinking beer at breakfast, and describe him as being "so crude and feckless", to which he responds "I know that my life make you nervous, but I tell you I can't live in service." The song's title derives from Desmond Dekker's 1967 song "007 (Shanty Town)", and is in homage to Ray Gange, who had portrayed a roadie who quits his job to follow the Clash around in the 1980 film Rude Boy. Rudie Can't Fail was the working title of a planned second movie for which The Clash would provide the soundtrack. Reference is made also to Dr Alimantado, in the line "Like the doctor who was born for a purpose". The line "You're looking pretty smart in your chicken skin suit", may refer to Alimantado's debut album, Best Dressed Chicken in Town.

See also
 Rudy's Can't Fail Cafe, a diner in California named after the song

References

1979 songs
The Clash songs
Reggae songs
Songs written by Joe Strummer
Songs written by Mick Jones (The Clash)
Song recordings produced by Guy Stevens
Post-punk songs